Vogelweide may refer to:

 Walther von der Vogelweide ( 1170– 1230)
 9910 Vogelweide, a main belt asteroid
, 2013 novel by Uwe Timm

German-language surnames